Kızılpınar Atatürk  is a neighborhood in Çerkezköy district of Tekirdağ Province, Turkey. At  it is almost merged to Çerkezköy. The population of Kızılpınar Atatürk is 22,966

References

External links
 Tekirdağ Governor's Official Website
 Metropolitan Municipality of Tekirdağ
 District municipality's Official Website

Populated places in Tekirdağ Province
Towns in Turkey
Çerkezköy District
Things named after Mustafa Kemal Atatürk